All the Moron's Men is a 1999 Italian comedy film directed by Paolo Costella.

The movie's title is a parody of All the President's Men (Tutti gli uomini del presidente in Italian).

Cast

Soundtrack

References

External links

1999 films
Italian comedy films
1999 comedy films
1990s Italian-language films
1990s Italian films